The Yellow Peril: Dr Fu Manchu & The Rise of Chinaphobia is a 2014 non-fiction book by the British educationalist and writer,  Sir Christopher Frayling.

The book examines Western world’s attitude towards Chinese people over several hundred years. It draws on a broad range of cultural references including fiction, film, theatre, music, television, comics and poetry; to describe the evolution of Sinophobia in the West and argues for its ongoing resilience today.

Notable reviews
Review by Julia Lovell in The Guardian, October 30, 2014
Review in the Financial Times, October 17, 2014
Review by Yo Zushi in the New Statesman, December 4, 2014
Review in The Irish Times, November 4, 2014

References

2014 non-fiction books
Thames & Hudson books